A writ for the election of the 7th General Assembly of Nova Scotia was issued on Jan. 22, 1793, returnable by March 20, 1793. The assembly convened on March 20, 1793, held seven sessions, and was dissolved on October 11, 1799.

Sessions
Dates of specific sessions are under research.

Governor and Council
Governor-in-Chief of British North America:
Guy Carleton 
Robert Prescott -named December 15, 1796
Sir Robert Milnes -named July 30, 1799
Lieutenant Governor: Sir John Wentworth

Technically, Gov. Carleton was appointed not as governor general, but as Governor of Quebec, New Brunswick, Nova Scotia, and St. John's Island (four simultaneous appointments).  Since a governor only has power when actually in their jurisdiction, the three additional appointments were effectively meaningless, with Lt. Gov. Wentworth serving as acting governor.

The members of the Council are currently under research.

House of Assembly

Officers
Speaker of the House:
Thomas Henry Barclay of Annapolis Township -resigned June 7, 1799
Richard John Uniacke of Queens County -elected June 7, 1799.
Clerk of the House: James Boutineau Francklin
Sergeant at Arms: Adolphus Veith -appointed March 10, 1790

Division of seats
The customary assignment of seats was continued: 4 seats assigned to Halifax County, 2 seats to the other counties and to Halifax Township, and 1 seat to the other townships, for a total of 39 seats.

Members
Amherst Township
Thomas Lusby
Annapolis County
Thomas Millidge
James Moody
Annapolis Township
Thomas Barclay -resigned June 7, 1799, appointed Consul-General in New York for the North Eastern States of America.
Barrington Township
John Sargent -took seat March 25, 1793.
Cornwallis Township
William Baxter
Cumberland County
William Freeman
Samuel Embrie
Digby Township
Henry Rutherford
Falmouth Township
Jeremiah Northup
Granville Township
Alexander Howe
Halifax County
Jonathan Sterns -died May 23, 1798.
James Stewart -by-election June 15, 1798, took seat June 15, 1798.
James Michael Freke Bulkeley -died November 13, 1796.
Charles Morris (1759–1831) -by-election February 13, 1797, took seat June 6, 1797.
Lawrence Hartshorne
Michael Wallace
Halifax Township
John George Pyke
William Cochran
Hants County
Hector MacLean
William Cottnam Tonge
Horton Township
Samuel Leonard
Kings County
Jonathan Crane -election declared invalid March 30, 1793.
Benjamin Belcher -declared elected and took seat March 30, 1793.
Elisha DeWolf
Liverpool Township
Samuel Hart
Londonderry Township
Robert McElhinney
Lunenburg County
John William Schwartz
Edward James
Lunenburg Township
John Bolman
Newport Township
Shubael Dimock
Onslow Township
Charles Dickson -died September 3, 1796.
Daniel Eaton -by-election, took seat June 6, 1797.
Queens County
Simeon Perkins -took seat March 25, 1793.
Benajah Collins -took seat June 30, 1794.  Resigned and left for Danvers, Massachusetts, September 1797.
Richard John Uniacke -by-election, took seat June 8, 1798
Shelburne County
Stephen Skinner -took seat March 25, 1793.
James Humphreys -took seat March 25, 1793.  Returned to Philadelphia in 1797.
George Gracie -by-election, took seat June 15, 1798.
Shelburne Township
Colin Campbell -took seat March 25, 1793.
Sydney County
John Stuart -took seat March 25, 1793.
Thomas Cutler -took seat June 6, 1794.
Truro Township
Matthew Archibald
Windsor Township
John McMonagle
Yarmouth Township
Samuel Sheldon Poole -took seat April 5, 1793.

Note:  Unless otherwise noted, members were elected at the general election, and took their seats at the convening of the assembly.  By-elections are special elections held to fill specific vacancies.  When a member is noted as having taking their seat on a certain date, but a by-election isn't noted, the member was elected at the general election but arrived late.

References
David Allison; "History of Nova Scotia", Bowen, Halifax, 1916. 
Journal and proceedings of the House of Assembly of the province of Nova-Scotia, begun the 20th day of March ... (1793)

07
1793 in Canada
1794 in Canada
1795 in Canada
1796 in Canada
1797 in Canada
1798 in Canada
1799 in Canada
1793 establishments in Nova Scotia
1799 disestablishments in Nova Scotia